This article presents the discography of Procol Harum.

Albums

Studio albums

Live albums

Compilation albums

Video albums

EPs

Singles

See also
 The Long Goodbye (1995 Procol Harum tribute album by various artists)

Notes

References

External links
 All about Procol Harum on record on Procol Harum official web site.
 [ Procol Harum Discography] at Allmusic
 Procol Harum at Discogs
 Procol Harum at Rate Your Music

Discographies of British artists
Rock music group discographies